Thornhill are an Australian metal band from Melbourne, formed in 2015. The band currently consists of vocalist Jacob Charlton, guitarist Ethan McCann, drummer Ben Maida, and bass guitarist Nick Sjogren. Thornhill have released two studio albums: The Dark Pool (2019) and Heroine (2022), and two EPs: 13 (2016) and Butterfly (2018).

History

Foundation and early years (2015–2017) 
The band had its initial beginnings in 2015 when Jacob Charlton, Ben Maida, Sam Anderson and Ethan McCann began performing in Battle of the Bands competitions whilst at high-school at Vermont Secondary College in outer suburban Melbourne. During this period the band described  The Amity Affliction, Muse and Northlane as important musical influences. 

The band's first formal release occurred in 2016 with debut single "XY" on 2 June 2016, featuring Void of Vision's Jack Bergin. Soon after in August 2016, Thornhill released their debut EP, 13, before going on to produce the self-released single "Temperer" in May 2017.

After a positive critical reception to 13 and "Temperer", the band toured as support acts for several Australian local metal bands including Void of Vision and Hellions. In 2017 the band won a Triple J Unearthed competition to support the British band Architects as part of their 2017 tour of Australia. The publicity following this, as well as ongoing airtime on Triple J radio, including on the 'Home and Hosed' segment, saw the band go on to support Alpha Wolf, The Brave, Graves and, one of the band's early influences, Northlane in 2017. The band released of the single "Limbo" on 15 August 2017. Thornhill finished 2017 as Triple J's weekly feature artist in November.

During late 2017 guitarist, Sam Anderson, left the band and was replaced by Matt van Duppen, who at the time was also guitarist for heavy-act Better Half. At the time Matt also assumed the role as the band's manager.

Signing with UNFD and Butterfly EP (2018–2019) 
Thornhill began early 2018 by supporting Australian metalcore heavyweight Parkway Drive at the Forum Theatre in Melbourne before going on to again support the Architects in Adelaide. Around this time the band revealed that it had signed a record deal with UNFD, an independent record label based in Melbourne, Australia and home to a number of Australian rock and metal artists.

On 16 February 2018 the band released its second EP titled Butterfly, now under the UNFD label. The band's first ever headline show premiering Butterfly live followed on 7 April at the Melbourne venue, Cherry Bar, to a sold-out crowd.

Thornhill embarked on a series of shows throughout 2018 and early 2019, supporting bands for Australian tours including Ocean Grove, Make Them Suffer and In Hearts Wake. The band's year of heavy touring culminated in a feature at Unify Festival 2019, a multi-day rock and heavy based music festival held in January in Gippsland, Victoria, Australia.

The band released the single "Coven" on 4 April 2019 followed by The Coven Australian Tour.

The Dark Pool and Heroine (2019–present) 
On 25 October 2019, the band released its first studio album The Dark Pool, under the UNFD label. The album debuted on the ARIA Albums Chart at number 20 and featured a complement of music videos showcasing the album's doomsday and spiritualistic themes. The Dark Pool gained widespread attention leading to publicity with rock and heavy-metal focused journals and news sites. The band had its first headline Australian tour in November 2019, visiting Melbourne, Sydney, Brisbane and Adelaide, debuting The Dark Pool live at 'Stay Gold' in Melbourne. The album gained Thornhill a nomination for "Best International Breakthrough Band" at the '2020 Heavy Music Awards' by Amazon Music UK. The Dark Pool was selected by Triple J as the station's 'Feature Album' for the first week of December 2019

In November, the band headlined 'Misery: Emo Boat Party', a nautical-inspired gig held on board 'The Lady Cutler', a cruising boat departing Melbourne where the members of the band dressed up in old seamen style outfits.

The band announced its first international tour, touring Europe in January 2020 with Ded as supports for Wage War. The band played shows across the UK, Netherlands, Germany and Belgium. Immediately following this tour the band announced plans for a second international tour in 2020. Unfortunately, this was cancelled due to border restrictions following the COVID-19 epidemic. The band announced plans in late 2020 for another international Europe and UK tour for late 2021 with August Burns Red, Bury Tomorrow and Miss May I.

Thornhill played at Download Festival 2020 Melbourne and Sydney in March 2020, their last show before the COVID-19 pandemic.

On 5 April 2020 a glitch in Triple J Darwin's broadcast system saw Thornhill make headlines when track "Lily and the Moon" was accidentally played on public radio on-loop for nearly four hours from approximately 4:30 am to 8:30 am.

Despite not touring during most of 2020, Thornhill released an instrumental edition of The Dark Pool on 1 May 2020, and an isolated vocals edition of The Dark Pool on 29 May 2020.

On 5 February 2021 the band's lead singer, Jacob Charlton, featured on the single "Year of the Rat" (featuring Jacob Charlton) by Void of Vision, a rework of the band's original song from their 2019 album  Hyperdaze. This track represented Thornhill coming full circle as Void of Vision's lead singer, Jack Bergin, featured on Thornhill's first single "XY".

The band was able to recommence live shows in March 2021 and began by touring Queensland, Australia. Unfortunately the band was caught in the middle of a COVID-19 outbreak in Brisbane at the time and was forced to return to Melbourne to quarantine, requiring the rescheduling of the rest of their tour planned for the Australian East Coast

Thornhill released the single "Casanova" on 28 October 2021, premiering on Triple J. "Casanova" signified a shift in away from Thornhill's previous style toward a pop-metal fusion.

On 24 January 2022, the band released the single "Arkangel", followed by single "Hollywood" on 7 March 2022, and "Raw" on 23 May 2022.

Thornhill released its second studio album Heroine on 3 June 2022.

On 16 September 2022, the band announced the cancellation of their upcoming October/November tour with August Burns Red, Bury Tomorrow, and Miss May I, citing feeling "mentally burnt out" recently, being "forced to consider the longevity of the band" in order to "recharge and be ready to go again in 2023". The band also announced the departure of guitarist Matt "MVD" van Duppen, who will be stepping aside from performing and touring with the band in order to focus on full-time management of the band.  

On 24 January 2023, the band revealed that their rehearsal space had been broken into and that $100,000 worth of personal belongings and musical equipment had been stolen. They later launched a GoFundMe to replace said equipment.

Members 
Current
 Jacob Charlton – vocals (2016–present)
 Ethan McCann – guitar (2016–present)
 Ben Maida – drums (2016–present)
 Nick Sjogren – bass guitar (2016–present)

Former
 Sam Anderson – guitar (2016–2017)

 Matt van Duppen – guitar (2017–2022) manager (2022-present)

Timeline

Discography

Studio albums

Extended plays

Awards

ARIA Music Awards
The ARIA Music Awards are a set of annual ceremonies presented by Australian Recording Industry Association (ARIA), which recognise excellence, innovation, and achievement across all genres of the music of Australia. They commenced in 1987. 

! 
|-
| 2022
| Heroine
|  Best Hard Rock or Heavy Metal Album
| 
| 
|-

Heavy Music Awards 
Launched in 2017, the Heavy Music Awards democratically recognise the best of the year across the heavy music landscape – artists, events, photographers, designers, producers and more. With a panel of several hundred industry insiders nominating the finalists, the public has the final say on who wins.

References 



External links 
 UNFD | Thornhill Artist Page
 Thornhill on Bandcamp
 Thornhill on Facebook

Australian metalcore musical groups
Musical groups established in 2006
UNFD artists
Musical groups from Melbourne